The history of football in India is a long and detailed one, as it was the national sport at one time. The impetus for this was to unify the Indian Army. There is evidence for refereed between a team of football games being played in the Indian Army since at least 1949. India is home to some of the oldest football clubs in the world, and the world's third oldest competition, the Durand Cup. There was a time when football in India was highly celebrated. The Indian football outfit was called the "Brazilians of Asia".

1800s

Football was introduced to India by British soldiers in the mid-nineteenth century. It spread because of the efforts of Nagendra Prasad Sarbadhikari. In 1888 the Durand Cup was founded by then India's Foreign Secretary, Mortimer Durand at Shimla, India. The Durand Cup is the third oldest football competition behind the FA Cup and the Scottish Cup. It was initiated, as a recreation for British troops stationed in India. Royal Scots Fusiliers won the first edition of the cup by beating Highland Light Infantry 2–1 in the Final. In 1893 the IFA Shield was founded as the fourth oldest trophy in the world. Calcutta, then capital of British India, soon became the hub of Indian football. Sarada FC was the oldest Indian football club.

Calcutta FC was the first club to be established in 1872. Other early clubs include Dalhousie Club, Traders Club and Naval Volunteers Club.

In 1889 India's oldest current team Mohun Bagan A.C. was founded as "Mohun Bagan Sporting Club". This was the first club to be under the rule of the army. Both Hindus and Muslims players played in it. Several football clubs like Calcutta FC, Sovabazar and Aryan Club were established in Calcutta during the 1890s. Tournaments like the Gladstone Cup, Trades Cup and Cooch Behar Cup also started around this time. R B Ferguson Football Club was established on February 20, 1899 in Thrissur, Kerala and it was the oldest football club in the southern part of India. The club was named after the Kochi Police Superintendent, R B Ferguson. The club was famed by the nickname Young Men's Football Club and played a huge role in promoting football in Kerala during the early 1900s.

The first Indian Federation, the Indian Football Association, was founded in 1893 but did not have a single Indian on its board other than.

1900–1950

Several clubs were founded, more Cup competitions were introduced and Indian players became more common. The major event that showed a rise in Indian Football was in 1911 when Mohun Bagan AC defeated East Yorkshire Regiment 2–1 in the final of the IFA Shield. This was the first time an Indian team won a major national tournament. 
The Durand Cup, first held in Shimla in 1888, was the first Indian football competition and is incidentally the third oldest surviving competition the World over. It was started by Sir Mortimer Durand.

In the 1940s "Aurora Football Club" the second newest club in southern India was formed in Kerala. It was formed by the football loving fans of Ollur (Thrissur) which started its football journey from Thrissur.

The first known official international tour by Indian team which consists of both Indian and British players were in 1924, where the team was led by legendary Indian footballer Gostha Paul. Football teams consisting of entirely Indian players started to tour Australia, Japan, Indonesia, and Thailand during the late 1930s. The first international match India played before independence is yet to be verified, but the trace of first international match that India played overseas was against Ceylon in 1933. It was India's second International tour, where Gostha Paul led the Indian side to a victory over the host country with 1–0 score. On 4 July 1936 India played against visiting Chinese team, which was held at Calcutta. The match was a draw 1–1  After the success of several Indian football clubs abroad, the All India Football Federation (AIFF) was formed in 1937.

In 1938, India made an official tour to Australia where they played matches against many clubs and the  Australian national side too. From 3 September 1938 at Sydney, India played 5 friendly matches with Australia. At the Sydney match they saw a defeat of 5–3. third match was at Brisbane, where the Indians fought back for a draw of 4–4. In the third match at Newcastle, on 17 September India registered their first win by a margin of 4–1. But the Australians defeated India in the next two matches held at Sydney and Melbourne with a score line of 5–4 and 3–1 respectively.

On their way to 1948 London Olympics, Chinese team again visited India, where they  played Mohammedan fc, East Bengal, Mohun Bagan then finally on 17 July 1948, a friendly match held at Kolkata, where they were defeated by the Indian national side by 0-1 score. The 1948 London Olympics was India's first major international tournament, where a predominately barefooted Indian team lost 2–1 to France, failing to convert two penalties. The Indian team was greeted and appreciated by the crowd for their sporting manner."The French had been given a run for their money – and that, too, by the barefooted Indians!", the British media expressed. At a press conference, shortly after, the Indians were asked why they played barefooted. The ever witty then Indian captain Talimeren Ao said, “Well, you see, we play football in India, whereas you play BOOTBALL!” which was applauded by the British. The next day, that comment was splashed in the newspapers of London. Sarangapani Raman scored the only goal for India in that match and thus the first Indian international goal ever in the Olympics.

The 1950 World Cup
India qualified by default for the 1950 FIFA World Cup finals as a result of the withdrawal of all of their scheduled opponents. But the governing body AIFF decided against going to the World Cup, being unable to understand the importance of the event at that time. Reason shown by AIFF was that there was the cost of travel, although FIFA agreed to bear a major part of the travel expenses, lack of practice time, team selection issues and valuing Olympics over FIFA World cup.

Although FIFA imposed a rule banning barefoot play following 1948 Olympics where India had played barefoot, the suggestion that the Indian team refused to play because they were not allowed to play barefoot is not entirely true; according to the then-Indian captain Sailen Manna, it was invented to cover up. The team had not made it past the first round of the FIFA World Cup Qualifiers until 2018, when they defeated Nepal 2–0 over the course of two home-and-away games.

1951–1962: The golden era of Indian football
The period from 1951 to 1962 is considered the golden era in Indian football. Under the tutelage of  Syed Abdul Rahim India became the best team in Asia. The Indian team started the 1950s with victory in the 1951 Asian Games which they hosted. India beat both Indonesia and Afghanistan 3–0 to reach the final where they beat Iran 1–0. In 1952, India continued their form by winning the Colombo Quadrangular Cup held in Sri Lanka. This is called as the Golden time of Indian football. As four years earlier, many of the team played without boots but after the result in the Olympics AIFF immediately made it mandatory to wear boots.

India also won three further editions of the Quadrangular Cup, which were held in Burma, Calcutta and Dhaka in 1953, 1954 and 1955 respectively. India then went on to finish eighth in the 1954 Asian Games held in Manila.

At the 1956 Olympics they finished fourth, this is the second time India made history in the world of football. India first met hosts Australia, winning 4–2 with Neville D'Souza becoming the first Asian to score a hat trick in the Olympics and also making India the first Asian team to reach the Olympic semi-finals. They lost 4–1 to Yugoslavia, and lost the third place play-off match 3–0 to Bulgaria.

India participated in the 1958 Asian Games in Tokyo, Japan where they finished fourth, and the Merdeka Cup 1959 in Malaysia finishing second. The side started off 1960 with Asian Cup qualifiers in which they failed to qualify. India went on to win the 1962 Asian Games where they beat South Korea 2–1 in the final, and two years later finished second in the 1964 AFC Asian Cup which was held in round-robin format. India played in the Merdeka Cup in 1964, 1965 and 1966 where they finished 2nd, 3rd and 3rd.

1963–1984: Post-golden era
Rahim's death in the early '60s pegged Indian football back after a successful period. India played in the 1966 Asian Games in Bangkok but were eliminated in first round. India then took third place in the 1970 Asian Games, beating Japan 1–0 in the third place, play-off. In mid-'70s, Indian youth team jointly won the Youth Asian Cup with Iran. Indian football would go through a barren phase in '70s, '80s, and '90s, gradually losing its foothold as a top Asian team.

In 1984 India qualified for the 1984 Asian Cup. The team were placed in Group B but ended in last place after losing all but 1 match (which was a draw). India also failed to score during the Asian Cup as well which brought up questions about team selection.

Mohun Bagan AC created history again when they went on to win the IFA Shield in 1978 after a 2–2 draw against FC Ararat Yerevan from Soviet Union. The club became the first Indian side, post-independence, to win the title while competing with a non-Asian side.
   
East Bengal F.C. club went on to win the 1973 IFA Shield against Pyongyang City Sports Club of North Korea.

In the 90's, FC Kochin was formed in Kochi, Kerala. In the 1990s, it was the only football club from Kerala in the National Football League. FC Kochin had contributed substantially to the advancement of Kerala football within its short span.

1985–2000
India won gold medals in the SAF Games of both 1984 (in Dhaka) and 1987 (Calcutta). They won the inaugural SAARC Cup in 1993 in Lahore, and finished runner-up in Colombo two years later. By 1997 the competition had been renamed as the SAFF Cup, and India won it in both 1997 and 1999 edition, when they hosted it in Goa.

India also got a major boost when the All India Football Federation created the National Football League in 1996. This was India's first ever national domestic league.

2000–2010: The rebirth of Indian football
Although India failed to qualify for the 2004 Asian Cup, the senior team gained the silver medal in the inaugural Afro Asian Games, with victories over Rwanda and Zimbabwe (then 85 places ahead of India in the world rankings), losing the final 1–0 to Uzbekistan. As a result, Indian football has steadily earned greater recognition and respect, both within the country and abroad. In November 2003 then-India coach Stephen Constantine was named AFC Manager of the Month.

India lost to Pakistan and Bangladesh in the 2003 SAFF Cup, and defeats in the 2006 World Cup qualifiers meant Stephen Constantine was sacked. The LG Cup win in Vietnam under Stephen Constantine was one of the few bright spots in the early part of the 2000s. It was India's first victory in a football tournament outside the subcontinent since 1974. India defeated hosts Vietnam 3–2 in the final despite trailing 2–0 after 30 minutes.

In 2005 Syed Nayeemuddin was appointed as India coach but he was immediately sacked the following year after heavy defeats in 2007 AFC Asian Cup qualifiers. Much traveled and experienced coach Bob Houghton was later appointed coach of the team in 2006. Under Houghton, India saw a huge revival in World Football. In August 2007, the Indian national team won the Nehru Cup for the first time in its history beating Syria 1–0. In August the following year, India defeated Tajikistan 4–1 to lift the 2008 AFC Challenge Cup and, in turn, qualified for the 2011 AFC Asian Cup in Qatar. In 2009 August, India again won the Nehru Cup beating Syria again but this time in penalties (6–5).

Club-wise Indian Football took a turn for the better as the National Football League folded in 2006 and in 2007 the brand new I-League was started. The first I-League season was won by Goa club Dempo. During the 2008 AFC Cup Dempo made history when they made it all the way to the semi-finals of the AFC Cup before losing out to Safa Beirut SC.

East Bengal F.C. club of Kolkata won the ASEAN Club Championship in 2003.

On 9 December 2010, it was announced that the AIFF had signed a new 15-year, 700–crore deal with Reliance Industries and the International Management Group.

2011: The 2011 AFC Asian Cup
In the beginning of 2011 India took part in the AFC Asian Cup for the first time in 27 years. India were placed in Group C with Australia, Bahrain, and South Korea. On 10 January 2011 India played their first match against Australia where they lost 4–0. Then on 14 January 2011, India played Bahrain where again they lost 5–2 with Sunil Chhetri and Gouramangi Singh scoring. Then on 18 January 2011 India played their final match of the tournament against South Korea where they again lost 4–1. Sunil Chhetri was the goal scorer for India which meant that he scored the most goals for India in the tournament with two goals in three matches.

2011 - 2013: A new beginning
Since the 2011 Asian Cup the All India Football Federation has been working very hard on Indian Football. They allowed former coach Bob Houghton to coach the Indian side in the 2012 AFC Challenge Cup qualifiers. India played its first match in 2012 AFC Challenge Cup qualification on 21 March winning 3–0 against Chinese Taipei, with Jewel Raja Shaikh, Sunil Chhetri and Jeje Lalpekhlua scoring the goals. On 23 March they faced Pakistan. India came from behind and defeated Pakistan 3–1 with Jeje Lalpekhlua scoring 2 goals and Steven Dias scoring one. On 25 March they faced Turkmenistan their last 2012 AFC Challenge Cup qualifying game and India drew the game 1–1. The result meant that they finished on top of Group B and qualified for the 2012 AFC Challenge Cup.

In April 2011 Houghton was resigned as India coach after reports of racial abuse to an Indian referee during a match against Vietnam. In May 2011 the AIFF appointed Armando Colaco as Indian head coach. The Indian senior team defeated Qatar 2–1 in an historic international friendly before the start of the world cup qualifier against UAE (United Arab Emirates). India went on to lose the qualifying encounter by 5–2 on aggregate over two legs, having contentiously suffered two red cards and two converted penalties in the first 23 minutes of the opening leg, which the UAE won by 3–0. The Indian national team went on a friendly tour to the Caribbean Islands, which turned out to be very unsuccessful. Recently they were beaten 2–1 by Guyana.

2013 - 2022 - Rising of Indian football 

In 2013 a brand new League Called Indian super League was started. The first Indian super League season was won by Kolkata club ATK

In 2016, Mohun Bagan AC of Kolkata became the first Indian club to qualify for the second round of AFC Champions League Qualifier, when they defeated the Tampine Rovers FC of Singapore on 27 January 2016. In addition, they created another history by defeating South China AA of Hong Kong with a margin of 4 goals in 2016 AFC Cup on 9 March 2016. This is, till date, the highest margin of victory by any Indian club side on foreign soil. In 2017, The FIFA under -17 world cup was hosted by India.

In August 2022, FIFA announced that “The Bureau of the FIFA Council  unanimously decided to suspend the All India Football Federation (AIFF) with immediate effect due to undue influence from third parties, which constitutes a serious violation of the FIFA Statutes.”  11 days later FIFA lifted the suspension imposed on the All India Football Federation (AIFF) that allowed the Under-17 women's World Cup  to go ahead as planned.

2023-2026 New League system Vision 2047 Phase-1

AIFF has broken down ‘Vision 2047’ into six four-year strategic plans. The first of these will look to cover the period till 2026. According this plan in 2026 Indian football season 40 clubs will participate in ISL(14 clubs), I-League (14 clubs) and I-League-2 (12clubs). Moreover 60 clubs will participate in 5 zonal leagues with minimum 12 teams in each zone. 

How ever AIFF's new strategic plan 2026, the number of teams in the current leagues needs to be increased. By the 2026 season, ILeague-2 will have to be rebranded to a full league format with at least 12 teams with relegation and promotion. In 2026 season onwards State FA league champions won't promote directly to I-League2. SFA champions will promote their respective Zonal league and Then each Zonal league champions will play I-League-2 qualifier.

2026-2030 Proposed League system Vision 2047 Phase-2

Regional League and Zonal League

According to Vision 2047, there will be 40 clubs in various national leagues when the first strategic plan is completed by the 2026 season. Also there will be 60 clubs in 5 zonal leagues. Apart from this there will be 300-450 clubs in 30-35 State Football Associations leagues. The state football associations produces 30-35 state champions every season. The proposed system is unable to accommodate these SFA champions. This will pave the way for revamping the zonal league into a new structure.

Regional League

All SFAs under AIFF are divided into 2 regions to form a Regional league below I-League2. The bottom teams in I-League2 will relegate to Regional League and the champions of Regional League will promote to I-League2.

Bottom teams in Regional League will relegate to Zonal league. Zonal League champions will promote to Regional League.

Zonal League
Currently the zones are divided by geographically. North, West,East, South and North-East are the five zones. As per the new system, while zones are divided in proportion to the number of SFAs. According to this, there will be 8/12 zones instead of the current 5 zones. Each season SFA League Champions will be promoted to each Zonal League and teams who finish bottom in Zonal League will be relegated to SFA Leagues.Zonal league champions will be promoted to regional leagues.

2026-2030
According to the Vision 2047 after completing the second strategic plan in 2030 the Indian football structure would be like this.

References

History of football in India
India